Electronic Waste Recycling Act can refer to:
California Electronic Waste Recycling Act, passed in 2003
E-Cycle Washington, a Washington State, US law, passed in 2006
Waste Electrical and Electronic Equipment Directive, in Europe, passed in 2003